Elizabeth Howland (May 28, 1939 – December 31, 2015) was an American actress. She worked on stage and television, and was best known for playing waitress Vera Gorman in the sitcom Alice.

Howland originated the role of Amy in the original Broadway cast of Stephen Sondheim's Company, where she introduced the patter song "Getting Married Today".

Early life
Howland was born on May 28, 1939, in Brighton, Massachusetts. At the age of 16, she left home and followed a dancer friend to New York City. After a time of struggling, Howland made her Broadway debut in 1959 as Lady Beth in the musical Once Upon a Mattress, which transferred from off-Broadway. She went on to have roles in the musicals Bye Bye Birdie, High Spirits, Drat! The Cat! and Darling of the Day.

Career
Howland can be seen dancing and singing in the chorus of the movie Li'l Abner (1959) as Clem's wife, alongside future television star Valerie Harper. After appearing in Company, she left New York to relocate to California, where she made guest appearances on television series such as Love, American Style; Cannon; The Mary Tyler Moore Show; Little House on the Prairie; Eight Is Enough; and The Love Boat. For her work on Alice, Howland received four Golden Globe Award nominations. She later took on numerous telefilm roles, including You Can't Take It with You (as Essie) and A Caribbean Mystery.

She remained on Alice throughout its nine seasons. After the sitcom ended in 1985, Howland went into semi-retirement. She made occasional guest appearances (including Murder, She Wrote; Chicken Soup for the Soul; Sabrina the Teenage Witch; and The Tick) and starred in the ABC Afterschool Special, "Terrible Things My Mother Told Me".

Personal life
From 1961 to 1969, Howland was married to actor Michael J. Pollard, with whom she had a daughter.

In 2002, she wed actor Charles Kimbrough and remained married to him until her death in 2015. Kimbrough and Howland had appeared together in Company.

Death
Howland died of lung cancer on December 31, 2015, at age 76. Per her request, her death was not reported to the media until May 24, 2016.

Filmography

References

External links

 
 
 
 
 Beth Howland profile
 Beth Howland(Aveleyman)

1939 births
2015 deaths
Actresses from Boston
American film actresses
American musical theatre actresses
American stage actresses
American television actresses
Deaths from lung cancer in California
20th-century American actresses
21st-century American actresses
21st-century American women